KaS Product were a French electronic duo. Their music has been considered part of the French cold wave and electropunk movements. Formed in 1980, the duo consists of Spatsz (Daniel Favre) on electronics and rhythm machines with Mona Soyoc on guitar, vocals and piano. Spatsz worked at a psychiatric hospital previously while Soyoc worked with a jazz band before meeting Spatsz.

Their music is done in a similar minimal electronics and vocal style akin to Kaleidoscope-era Siouxsie and the Banshees, Suicide and Soft Cell. The press compared Soyoc's voice to that of Siouxsie Sioux.

Their first and second albums were re-released with bonus tracks. Try Out was re-released with five bonus tracks: "Mind", "Seven", "Doctor Insane", "In Need", and "Malena". By Pass was re-released with four bonus tracks: "Scape", "Sweet & Sour", "Crash" and "Party". All of the tracks on both CDs have been remastered.

On 1 February 2019, it was announced that Spatsz had died. He was 61 years old.

Discography

References

External links
Official webpage
Discogs profile.

French electronic music groups
Cold wave groups
French musical duos
Electronic music duos
Male–female musical duos